Athlone is a suburb of Cape Town located to the east of the city centre on the Cape Flats, south of the N2 highway. Two of the suburb's main landmarks are Athlone Stadium and the decommissioned coal-burning Athlone Power Station. Athlone is mainly residential and is served by a railway station of the same name. It however includes industrial (Athlone Industria 1 & 2) and commercial zones (Athlone CBD and Gatesville). There are many "sub-areas" within Athlone, including Gatesville, Rylands, Belgravia Estate, Bridgetown and Hazendal. Colloquially other areas around Athlone are also often included in the greater Athlone area even though the City of Cape Town might classify them as separate neighborhoods such as Rondebosch East, Crawford, and Manenberg.

History 
Originally known as West London the area was renamed Athlone after Alexander Cambridge, 1st Earl of Athlone who was Governor-General of the Union of South Africa from 1924 to 1930.

During Apartheid the area was designated a coloured neighborhood. Many people were resettled in the area after being forcibly evicted by the government under the Apartheid era Group Areas Act from other parts of Cape Town.

Athlone is the home of the Trojan Horse Memorial, a reminder of the Trojan Horse Incident which took place in 1985, when three anti-apartheid protesters were killed and fifteen others wounded in a police ambush. The incident took place near the Alexander Sinton Secondary School where students had demanded to attend school the month before.

The Athlone Magistrate’s court is the home of the Robert Waterwitch / Colleen Williams Memorial established in memory of two ANC activists who died in the struggle against apartheid. Waterwitch and Williams died an explosion outside of the court on 23 July 1989.

Demographics
As of the census of 2001, there were 11,556 households and 45,056 people residing in the suburb.  The racial makeup of the suburb was  3.21% Black African, 69.66% Coloured, 23.45% Indian/Asian, 3.68% White and 0% from other races.

The suburb population age varies with 28.38% under the age of 18, 28.37% from 18 to 34, 26.53% from 35 to 54, 8.04% from 55 to 64, and 8.66% who were 65 years of age or older.  For every 100 women there were 86.53 males.

82.58% of the population speak English, 15.18% speak Afrikaans, 1.13% speak Xhosa, 0.52% speak another African language and 0.59% some other language as a first language.

Education
Primary Schools

Athlone North Primary, Regina Cloie Primary, Silverlea Primary, Blossom Primary, Bridgeville Primary, Kewtown Primary, Alicedale Primary, Heatherdale Primary, Turfhall Primary, Cypruss Primary, St Raphaels Primary and Rylands Primary, Sunnyside Primary, 

High Schools

Spes Bona High, Ned Doman High, Alexander Sinton High, Athlone High, Peak View High, Bridgetown High, Rylands High and Belgravia High 

Higher Education

College of Cape Town Athlone Campus and College of Cape Town Crawford Campus

Organisations in Athlone
The Anti-Eviction Campaign and the Gatesville Hawkers Association have a strong presence with many members in Athlone. There are many neighbourhood watches in the Athlone area, including Rylands Neighbourhood Watch, Surrey Patrol, Greenhaven Crime Watch and Habibia Neighbourhood Watch.

Athlone Power Station

The decommissioned Athlone Power Station is situated alongside the N2. The cooling towers, commonly referred to as the "Athlone Towers", were demolished on 22 August 2010.

References

External links
Athlone, Cape Town, South Africa
Athlone protest archives

 
Suburbs of Cape Town